Amir Hamzić (born 5 January 1975) is a Bosnian-Herzegovinian retired football player.

References

1975 births
Living people
People from Zvornik
Association football midfielders
Bosnia and Herzegovina footballers
FK Drina Zvornik players
FK Sloboda Tuzla players
FC Aarau players
FC Anzhi Makhachkala players
NK Zvijezda Gradačac players
OFK Gradina players
Premier League of Bosnia and Herzegovina players
Swiss Super League players
Russian Premier League players
Bosnia and Herzegovina expatriate footballers
Expatriate footballers in Switzerland
Bosnia and Herzegovina expatriate sportspeople in Switzerland
Expatriate footballers in Russia
Bosnia and Herzegovina expatriate sportspeople in Russia